The Hsintao Power Plant is a gas-fired power plant in Guangxi Township, Hsinchu County, Taiwan.

History
The development of the power plant started after the second Independent power producer bidding held by Taiwan Power Company in 1995. The plant was commissioned on 1 March 2002. In November 2010, Kyushu Electric Power acquired 33.2% shares of the power plant.

Fuel
The natural gas fuel supply for the power plant is supplied by CPC Corporation.

See also

 List of power stations in Taiwan
 Electricity sector in Taiwan

References

2002 establishments in Taiwan
Buildings and structures in Hsinchu County
Energy infrastructure completed in 2002
Natural gas-fired power stations in Taiwan